Victor Sparre (né Smith; 4 November 1919 – 16 March 2008) was a Norwegian painter, glass designer and non-fiction writer.

Personal life
Sparre was born in Bærum as the son of librarian Victor Alf Smith and Eli Sparre. He was married to nurse Aase Marie Thomassen from 1955.

Career
Sparre studied at the Norwegian National Academy of Craft and Art Industry from 1936. He became a member of the Oxford Group. In 1938 he enrolled at the Norwegian National Academy of Fine Arts, and assisted Axel Revold making decorations for the Oslo City Hall. During the occupation of Norway by Nazi Germany he took part in resistance work and joined the underground art academy led by Axel Revold and Jean Heiberg, and later also joined the military resistance organization Milorg.

He has decorated 25 churches, including the Stavanger Cathedral, the Arctic Cathedral (Tromsdalen Church), Jeløy Church and Immanuel Church. Among his paintings are Altergang and  Svøpet from 1942, Individets død from 1969, Cellistens kone from 1974, and  Veronicas svededuk from 1977. He published the book Stenene skal rope in 1974, and The flame in the darkness in 1980, and participated in debates on human rights. He was decorated Knight, First Class of the Royal Norwegian Order of St. Olav in 2003.

References

1919 births
2008 deaths
Artists from Bærum
20th-century Norwegian painters
Norwegian male painters
21st-century Norwegian painters
Norwegian non-fiction writers
Norwegian resistance members
20th-century Norwegian male artists
21st-century Norwegian male artists